Royal District Nursing Service may refer to:

Royal District Nursing Service (South Australia), Australia
Royal District Nursing Service (Victoria), Australia